Ancyloptila is a genus of moths of the family Crambidae. It contains only one species, Ancyloptila lactoides, which is found on Aru.

References

Pyraustinae
Monotypic moth genera
Moths of Indonesia
Crambidae genera
Taxa named by Edward Meyrick